Xochitl Castaneda is the Founding Director of the Health Initiative of the Americas (HIA) at the School of Public Health, University of California (UC) Berkeley.

Education 
A medical anthropologist by training, Xochitl was educated in Guatemala and Mexico. She completed three post-doctoral fellowships: UC San Francisco, Harvard, and Amsterdam University.

Career 
Xochitl Castaneda served as Professor of Public Health Sciences and a Principal Investigator at Mexico’s National Institute of Public Health, for seven years and also directed the Department of Reproductive Health. 

Since 2008, she has served as a professor in Migration and Health at various University of California campuses. 

In 2020 Xochitl founded the Health Education for Latinos Program (HELP), a fund that provides annual scholarships to Latino low-income students to help them in their education for future health careers, both at the undergraduate and the graduate level.  

Under her direction, HIA has coordinated Binational Health Week for 22 consecutive years, one of the largest mobilization efforts in the Americas to improve the wellbeing of Latino immigrants. She has created the Annual Binational Policy Forum on Migration and Global Health, a collaboration among 30 universities and over 200 agencies. She is also the founder of the Athena Network, a world organization for the mental health of mobile populations. She has signed 50 memorandums of understanding with local, state, and federal institutions. 

She has also served on the board of directors and other membership positions of 20 organizations and programs including the California Wellness Foundation, California Immigrant Policy Center, CDC National Diabetes Education Program, the Latino Coalition for a Healthy California, and the National Council of Mexican Federations in North America (COFEM).

Awards 
In 2010, the California Latino Legislative Caucus honored her with the National Spirit Award for her leadership to improve the health of Latino immigrants in the U.S. In 1999, she received the National Mexican Award in Social Science and Medicine. 

In 2019, she received the Ohtli Award, presented by the Mexican government to a person who has positively affected the lives of Mexican nationals in the United States and other countries.  

In 2020, she received the National Health Award in the "Without Borders" category.

Publications
Xochitl has over 200 publications and has served as a consultant for more than 40 national and international institutions. She has contributed to the editorial board to 15 professional publications. She has presented the results of her academic and advocacy work in over 500 national and international conferences, symposiums, policy briefings, and other events.

Book Chapters 

 "Meanings and Signifiers of Fertility: The Use of Qualitative Methodology in Public Health" In Qualitative Methods in Public Health Research (1995) Public Health Perspectives No. 20, Nigeda G. & Langer A. (Eds) NIPH
 "Migration and the body: Mexican women working in agriculture in California" In Compartiendo historias de fronters: cuerpos, generos, generaciones y salud (2004)
 "Binational Innovation in Latino Immigrant Health: the Health Initiative of the Americas" In Reflections about Mexican Migration and Public Policy (2010) CONAPO Press
 "Binational Health Week: A Social Mobilization Program to Improve Latino Migrant Health" in Accountability Across Borders: Migrant Rights in North America (2019) University of Texas Press 
 2018  Castañeda X, Juan Pablo (Editor), National Council of University Students. Migration of Mexicans to the United States. Human Rights and Development. Volume 20 in the collection Mexico 2018-2024.

 2014  Castañeda X, Rodriguez-Lainz A. Studying Migrant Populations, General Considerations and Approaches: Migration and Health, a Research Methods Handbook. University of California Press.

 2013  Castañeda X, Felt E, Martinez-Taboada C, Castañeda N, Ramirez T. Migratory Stress and Mental Health in Adolescent Young Adult Mexican Immigrants Living in the United States: Contextualizing Acculturation. In Immigrants: Acculturation, Socioeconomic Challenges and Cultural Psychology. Judy Ho (Ed), Nova Science Publishers. 

 2013  Castañeda X, Zavella P. Las fronteras y los espacios del cuerpo: sexualidad, riesgo y vulnerabilidad en mujeres migrantes mexicanas en California. Ellas se van: Mujeres migrantes en Estados Unidos y España. México: Instituto de Investigaciones Sociales, UNAM Press.

 2011  Castañeda X, Ruiz M, Felt E, Schenker M. Health of Migrants: Working Towards a Better Future. In Global Health, Global Health Education, and Infectious Disease: The New Millennium, Part 1. Veljil A. Moellering R. (Eds.) Elsevier Press

Books

 Health Care During Pregnancy and Birth in Rural Areas (1989) Inter-American Social Security Studies Center Press, Mexico.
 Mexican and Central American Immigrants in the United States: Health Care Access (2006) CONAPO Press 
 Migration and Health: Mexican Immigrant Women in the U.S. (2010) CONAPO Press 
 Migration and Health: Young Mexican Immigrants in the US (2012) CONAPO Press
 English-Spanish Dictionary of Health Related Terms 4th Edition. (2012) Regents of the University of California 
 Migration and Health: Reflections and challenges about the health of migrants (2017) CONAPO-HIA-UCB-SPH 
 Migration and Health: Current challenges and opportunities (2020)  National Population Council (CONAPO), HIA-UCB-SPH 
 2016 Castaneda X, Bermúdez J, Reyes A, Wallace S. Migration and Health Perspectives on the immigrant population. Mexican Secretariat of the Interior Press

 2015  Bermúdez J, Reyes A, Schenker M, Castaneda X, Felt E, Wallace S. Migration and Health. Profile of Latin Americans in the United States. Mexican Secretariat of the Interior Press

 2014  Schenker M, Castaneda X, Rodriguez A. (Editors) Migration and Health Research Methodologies: a handbook for the study of migrant populations in the 21st Century. UC Press

 2013  Leite P, Castañeda X, Ramirez T, Wallace S. Migration and Health: Mexican Immigrants in the U.S. Mexican Secretariat of the Interior Press

External Links 
Health Education for Latinos Program website

References 

Health Initiative of the Americas. http://hia.berkeley.edu/index.php?page=xochitl-castaneda 
School of Public Health, UC Berkeley. http://sph.berkeley.edu/xochitl-castaneda 
The California Wellness Foundation http://www.calwellness.org/biographies/biography_board_castaneda.php

Mexican public health doctors
Women public health doctors